Marry Me Tonight is the debut album by Berlin-based Australian band HTRK, released on 2 February 2009. Produced by Lindsay Gravina and Rowland S. Howard of The Birthday Party, the album was the group's first full-length release and was distributed by record label Blast First Petite. The music incorporates elements of noise rock, shoegaze and other genres and received positive reviews on its release.

Track listing

Personnel
Jonnine Standish – vocals, percussion
Sean Stewart – bass, programming
Nigel Yang – guitar, programming, electronics
Rohan Rebeiro (of My Disco) – drums
Rowland S. Howard – guitar
Conrad Standish (of The Devastations) – bass

References

2009 debut albums
Blast First albums